Edu da Gaita (lit. Edu of the Harmonica, born Eduardo Nadruz in Jaguarão on October 13, 1916 -  Rio de Janeiro on August 23, 1982) was a Brazilian composer and harmonica player. Apart from releasing multiple solo albums, he also performed with Brazilian composer Radamés Gnattali and his sextet, touring Europa and South America

Selected filmography
 Berlin to the Samba Beat (1944)

Discography

Albums 
Violino cigano / Canção da Índia (1939) Columbia 78
Onde o céu azul é mais azul / Cantigas de roda (1941) Columbia 78
Uma gaita em Sevilha / Velhas melodias (1941) Columbia 78
Ritmo do Brasil / Fantasia espanhola (1944) Continental 78
Dança ritual do fogo / Andaluzia (1949) Continental 78
Poeta e camponês (I) / Poeta e camponês (II) (1949) Continental 78
Torna a Sorriento / O sole mio (1949) Continental 78
Capricho nortista (I) / Capricho nortista (II) (1950) Continental 78
Arabescos / Fumaça nos teus olhos (1950) Continental 78
Batuque / Juazeiro (1951) Continental 78
Ritmos de Tio Sam (Parte I) / Ritmos de Tio Sam (Parte II) (1951) Continental 78
Moto perpétuo / Poema (1952) Continental 78
Ruby / Numa pequena cidade espanhola (1954) Continental 78
Le grisby / Damasco (1955) Continental 78
Uma gaita sobe o morro / Talismã (1955) Continental 78
Moritat / Domingo sincopado (1956) Continental 78
Edu em 8 Ritmos/Nola/Brasileirinho (1957) Polydor 78
Manhã de carnaval / Samba de Orfeu (1959) Copacabana 78
Uma gaita para milhões (1960) Copacabana LP
Edu-Ontem e hoje (1965) Philips LP
Edu da Gaita [S/D] Eldorado CD

External links 
 Official website

1916 births
People from Jaguarão
Brazilian composers
Brazilian harmonica players
1982 deaths
20th-century composers